is a pop singer famous in her native Japan for her piano ballads.  She rose to fame after performing the end-title track for the Madhouse film The Girl Who Leapt Through Time in 2006. She was signed to a major record label the preceding year.

Biography 
Oku's musical training began at age 5 with piano lessons, but by age 9 she was also learning the trumpet and was a member of her school's brass band.

In 2004, Oku began to perform on the streets of Tokyo, mainly in Shibuya ward, but once sold 402 CDs in four hours outside Kashiwa railway station. Later that same year she released her first mainstream single Fireworks and performed her debut one-woman show to an audience of 135. Approached by Chiba TV, she made an appearance on the show Chiba Fighting Spirit.

Over the next year she toured western Japan and self-produced two more CD singles before releasing an album in April 2005. Soon afterwards she was signed up by record company Pony Canyon.

In April 2006, the animated film The Girl Who Leapt Through Time was released, with the theme songs "Garnet" and "Kawaranai Mono" sung by Oku.

Come spring 2007, Oku performed to a sell-out crowd at Shibuya C.C. Lemon Hall, and with the release of her album Time Note, she once again performed sold-out concerts there over three nights in July 2007.

Oku still occasionally busked in Tokyo railway stations in 2007, drawing a crowd, and selling her CDs there.

Since June 2005, Hanako Oku has hosted her KameKameHouse radio show on bayfm78 every Sunday night from 22:30 to 23:00. At the end of 2009, the show was renamed Lagan de Talk!. In 2010, Oku began hosting a new radio show E-Tracks Selection once a fortnight on FM OSAKA.  Starting January 12, the show airs from 21:00 to 21:30.

An animated music clip of the album version of Oku's song "Kimi no Egao" was released, through Pony Canyon's official YouTube channel, on May 7, 2017. Directed by Takuya Satō and titled Your Light: Kase-san and Morning Glories, the video is an adaptation of Hiromi Takashima's yuri manga Asagao to Kase-san. The album version of the song comes from Oku's sixth album, titled Good-Bye, released in 2012.

Discography

Albums

Singles

DVD

Blu-ray

References

External links 
  (In Japanese)
 Hanako Oku's profile on Pony Canyon's website (In Japanese)
 Hanako Oku's personal blog (24 February 2010 to present) (In Japanese)
 Hanako Oku's personal blog (21 January 2008 to 24 February 2010) (In Japanese)
 Hanako Oku's personal blog (4 October 2004 to 22 January 2008) (In Japanese)
 KameKameHouse radio show blog (In Japanese)
 Your Light ～Kase-san and Morning Glories～ on Pony Canyon's YouTube channel

Japanese women singer-songwriters
Japanese singer-songwriters
Japanese women pop singers
1978 births
People from Funabashi
Living people
Pony Canyon artists
Musicians from Chiba Prefecture
21st-century Japanese singers
21st-century Japanese women singers